Ramón Castro y Ramírez (1795–1867) was a Costa Rican politician.

Costa Rican politicians
1795 births
1867 deaths
Supreme Court of Justice of Costa Rica judges